The 2023 Florida Gators baseball team represents the University of Florida in the sport of baseball during the 2023 college baseball season. Florida competes in the Eastern Division of the Southeastern Conference (SEC). Home games will be played at Condron Ballpark on the university's Gainesville, Florida, campus, in the third season at the ballpark. The team is coached by Kevin O'Sullivan in his sixteenth season as Florida's head coach. The Gators enter the season looking to return to the College World Series after a home regional final loss in the 2022 NCAA Tournament.

Previous season

Ranked ninth in the D1 Baseball preseason poll, the Gators dropped their opening series against unranked Liberty, and would not reach the top 10 again until the opening weekend of conference play, which was highlighted by a 2–1 series win at rival Miami. The Gators would go 3–3 against their first two conference opponents in Alabama and LSU, and defeated  in their annual game in Jacksonville. However, Florida got swept at Georgia to drop to 3–6 in conference play. The Gators bounced back by taking the series against No. 2 Arkansas at home to get back to 5–7 against the conference. Traveling to Tallahassee to play the second of three games against Florida State, the Seminoles evened the series at one win apiece. The Gators lost their next two games in Nashville before avoiding the sweep against Vanderbilt. Florida would return home to host the top-ranked Tennessee Volunteers, who had lost only one conference game up to that point. The Volunteers were able to sweep the Gators by mounting a ninth-inning comeback and 11-inning defeat in the series finale, to move the Gators to 6–12 against the conference, featuring a 4–11 stretch against the gauntlet of LSU, Georgia, Arkansas, Vanderbilt, and Tennessee. The Gators moved to an even 15–15 conference record by the end of the season, winning each of their remaining series against Kentucky, defending national champion Mississippi State, Missouri, and South Carolina, and won the season series against Florida State in Gainesville with a 7–5 ten-inning victory.

In a SEC baseball tournament marred by significant weather delays, the Gators were able to overcome a second-round loss to Texas A&M by winning their next three games, including a semifinal win to avenge their earlier second round loss to the Aggies, to set up a Championship Game against the regular season champion Volunteers. Florida was able to stymie the prolific Volunteers offense for the first four innings, but ultimately surrendered the first seven runs of the game in a 5–8 loss.

Florida's run in the SEC Tournament proved to be enough to earn a No. 13 national seed, and host the Gainesville Regional. After a second-round loss to the Oklahoma Sooners, Florida was able to hold off Central Michigan with a 6–5 victory in the elimination game to set up a rematch against Oklahoma in the regional final. Florida was able to take the first game with a 7–2 victory to set up a winner-take-all game for the right to advance to the Super Regional against Virginia Tech. Florida got a 2–1 lead in the seventh inning before a 5-hour, 33-minute rain delay struck Gainesville. Florida was able to add to their lead to obtain a 3–1 advantage over the Sooners in the bottom of the seventh inning, but surrendered four runs in the top of the eighth inning, and was only able to make up one of the runs in the bottom of the ninth inning. As a result, their season came to a close with a late-night, rain delayed, 4–5 home loss to the eventual national runners-up.

Schedule

Schedule Source:
*Rankings are based on the team's current ranking in the D1Baseball poll.

Record vs. conference opponents

Rankings

References

Florida
Florida Gators baseball seasons
Florida Gators baseball